The 2016 Idaho State Bengals football team represented Idaho State University as a member of the Big Sky Conference during the 2016 NCAA Division I FCS football season. Led by Mike Kramer in his sixth and final year as head coach, the Bengals compiled an overall record of 2–9 with a mark of 1–7 in conference play, placing last out of 13 teams in the Big Sky. Idaho State played their home games at Holt Arena in Pocatello, Idaho.

On March 30, 2017, Kramer announced his retirement.<ref[>http://www.idahostatesman.com/sports/college/state-college-sports/article141788559.html College sports news] Idaho Statesman (subscription required)</ref> He finished at Idaho State with a six-year record of 18–50.

Schedule

Game summaries

Simon Fraser

at Colorado

at Oregon State

Sacramento State

at Portland State

at Northern Arizona

North Dakota

Southern Utah

at Montana

at Eastern Washington

Weber State

References

Idaho State
Idaho State Bengals football seasons
Idaho State Bengals football